Kaithappoo is a 1978 Indian Malayalam film, directed by Raghuraman. The film stars Madhu, KPAC Lalitha, Manavalan Joseph and Pattom Sadan. The musical score is by Shyam.

Cast
 
Madhu 
KPAC Lalitha 
Manavalan Joseph 
Pattom Sadan 
Raghavan 
Prathapachandran 
Adoor Bhavani 
Alummoodan 
Anandavally 
Aranmula Ponnamma 
Aryad Gopalakrishnan
Baby Sreekala
Baby Sumathi 
KPAC Sunny 
Khadeeja 
Kuthiravattam Pappu 
Master Natarajan
Meena 
Rani Chandra 
S. P. Pillai 
Sudheer 
Veeran

Soundtrack
The music was composed by Shyam and the lyrics were written by Bichu Thirumala.

References

External links
 

1978 films
1970s Malayalam-language films